Anne-Pierre, marquis de Montesquiou-Fézensac (17 October 173930 December 1798) was a French general and writer. Due to his literary talent, he became a member of the Académie française in 1784. He was elected to the Estates-General of 1789. He assumed command of the Army of the Midi in February 1792 and successfully invaded Savoy in September. Nevertheless, he was accused of treason by the Revolutionary government and fled to Switzerland before he could be arrested. He was allowed to return to France in 1795 and he died there three years later.

Career
He was born in Paris, of a family from Armagnac. He was brought up with the children of the king of France, and showed some taste for letters. He entered the army in 1754, was successively colonel of the Grenadiers and the Royal-Vaissaux regiment, and in 1780 was made maréchal-de-camp. Some pieces of verse and several comedies gained him admission to the Académie française in 1784. He was elected deputy to the Estates-General of 1789 by the nobles of Paris, and, animated by liberal ideas, he soon joined the Third Estate, and seconded Jacques Necker's financial schemes.

He served on the committee charged with the issue of assignats, and was named president of the Constituent Assembly on 14 March 1791. In May 1791 he was promoted lieutenant-general, served under Lafayette, and in February 1792 was given the command of the Army of the South. In September of the same year he completed the conquest of Savoy. In November 1792 he was accused of royalist leanings, and he fled to Switzerland. In 1795 his name was erased from the list of émigrés and he returned to Paris, where he died on 30 December 1798.

His is one of the names inscribed under the Arc de Triomphe, in column 23.

References

1739 births
1798 deaths
Military personnel from Paris
Members of the Académie Française
Anne-Pierre
Marquesses of Montesquiou-Fésensac
French Republican military leaders of the French Revolutionary Wars
Names inscribed under the Arc de Triomphe